Super Ser was a Spanish professional cycling team that existed in 1975 and 1976. It was sponsored by Spanish gas heater manufacturer Super Ser. The team's biggest victory was Agustín Tamames's win of the 1976 Volta a Catalunya. During the 1976 Tour de France the team included Pedro Torres and Luis Ocaña. They also had José Viejo, who won stage 11 by +22:50, the largest margin of victory for a solo breakaway in the post WW2 era, a record that still stands as of 2022.

References

Cycling teams based in Spain
Defunct cycling teams based in Spain
1975 establishments in Spain
1976 disestablishments in Spain
Cycling teams established in 1975
Cycling teams disestablished in 1976